Ridderstad is a Swedish noble family originating in Estonia. The family seat was located at Riddersholm in Uppland, Sweden.

Members of the Ridderstad family includes:
Carl Fredrik Ridderstad, 1807–1886, Swedish liberal politician and newspaper man, in 1840 he became partner of Östgöta Correspondenten.
Anton Ridderstad, 1848–1933, Swedish officer and historian, founded Captain Anton Ridderstads Foundation in 1932.
Eskil Ridderstad, 1881–1962, Swedish newspaper man.
Fred Ridderstad (born 1948), Swedish curler.
Sture Ridderstad, 1911–1989, Swedish actor.
Gunnar Ridderstad, born 1941, Swedish newspaper man.

References 

Swedish families
Swedish noble families